Stefan Rouenhoff (born 23 December 1978) is a German politician of the  Christian Democratic Union (CDU) who has been serving as a member of the Bundestag from the state of North Rhine-Westphalia since 2017.

Early career 
From 2010 until 2017, Rouenhoff worked in various capacities at the Federal Ministry for Economic Affairs and Technology. During that time, he served as one of the ministries spokespeople from 2012 until 2014. From 2014 until 2017, he was seconded to the Permanent Representation of Germany to the European Union in Brussels.

Political career 
Rouenhoff became a member of the Bundestag in the 2017 German federal election. In parliament, he is a member of the Committee on Economic Affairs and Energy. In that capacity, he serves as his parliamentary group’s rapporteur on foreign trade, Brexit and taxes.

References

External links 

 Bundestag biography 

1978 births
Living people
Members of the Bundestag for North Rhine-Westphalia
Members of the Bundestag 2021–2025
Members of the Bundestag 2017–2021
Members of the Bundestag for the Christian Democratic Union of Germany